Mumtaz Qadir (born 17 November 1986) is an Indian cricketer. He made his first-class debut for Services in the 2007–08 Ranji Trophy on 3 November 2007.

References

External links
 

1986 births
Living people
Indian cricketers
Services cricketers
Cricketers from Allahabad